Daniel Fitzhenry (born 8 December 1979) is an Australian former professional rugby league footballer who played in the 2000s. He played for the Wests Tigers in the NRL and Hull Kingston Rovers in the Super League.

Playing career 
Fitzhenry played Jersey Flegg for the South Sydney Rabbitohs and had spent a period playing with Limoux Rugby League in France before being injured in a car accident.

Injuries to the club's first choice player Benji Marshall saw Daniel used as a makeshift 5/8th at times.

Fitzhenry was a member of Wests Tigers team that won the 2005 NRL Grand Final, defeating North Queensland 30-16. He scored a try in the 63rd minute to give Wests a 12-point lead. He also scored a try in the 2006 World Club Challenge which the Tigers lost to Bradford.

Fitzhenry held the record for the most tries scored by a player at the Wests Tigers, with 43, before being surpassed by Benji Marshall in 2010.

In 2010, Fitzhenry returned to the Wests Tigers after two seasons playing with Hull Kingston Rovers. He played in 18 games during the season, but was often named as a reserve back, getting little time on the field.

At the end of the season, Fitzhenry retired from the NRL, signing a two-year contract to captain-coach Southcity in the Group 9 competition. He won a premiership in his first season with the club.

Career highlights 
Junior Club: Dorrigo & Nambucca Heads
First Grade Debut: Round 14, Wests Tigers v Penrith at Leichhardt Oval, 15 June 2002
Career Highlight: Wests Tigers Leading Tryscorer; try in the 2005 NRL Grand Final
Premierships:  2005 (West Tigers v North Queensland Cowboys)

External links 
Daniel Fitzhenry NRL Profile(no longer a valid link)
Official Daniel Fitzhenry Playing Statistics

References

 

1979 births
Living people
Australian rugby league coaches
Australian rugby league players
Hull Kingston Rovers players
Limoux Grizzlies players
Rugby league centres
Rugby league five-eighths
Rugby league fullbacks
Rugby league halfbacks
Rugby league players from New South Wales
Rugby league wingers
Wests Tigers players